Hipkins is an English surname. Notable people with the surname include:
 Alfred James Hipkins (1826–1903), English musician
 Chris Hipkins (born 1978), prime minister of New Zealand (2023-)
 Edith Hipkins (1854–1945), English painter
 Gavin Hipkins (born 1968), New Zealander photographer
 Roland Hipkins (1894–1951), English artist

English-language surnames